Sarah Maldoror ou la nostalgie de l'utopie is a Togolese short documentary film directed by Anne-Laure Folly. It was released in 1999.

The film is a tribute to Sarah Maldoror of Guadeloupe, who made the classic film Sambizanga (1972).
The film documents the constant political struggle in all her work for liberty, 
her affirmation of her négritude to the world, and her campaign for recognition of black poets.
At the 1997 FESPACO press conference for her new film Les Oubliées, Anne-Laure Folly Reimann had already paid honor to Sarah Maldoror, saying:

References
Citations

Sources

External links
 

1999 films
Togolese films